The Principality or Margraviate of (Brandenburg-) Ansbach ( or ) was a  principality in the Holy Roman Empire centered on the Franconian city of Ansbach. The ruling Hohenzollern princes of the land were known as margraves, as their ancestors were margraves (so the principality was a margraviate but not a march).

History 
The principality was established at the death of Frederick V, Burgrave of Nuremberg, on 21 January 1398, when his lands were partitioned between his two sons. The younger son, Frederick VI, received Ansbach and the elder, John III, received Bayreuth. After John III's death on 11 June 1420, the two principalities were reunited under Frederick VI, who had become Elector Frederick I of Brandenburg in 1415.

Upon Frederick I's death on 21 September 1440, his territories were divided between his sons; John received the principality of Bayreuth (Brandenburg-Kulmbach), Frederick received Brandenburg, and Albert received Ansbach. Thereafter Ansbach was held by cadet branches of the House of Hohenzollern, and its rulers were commonly called Margraves of Brandenburg-Ansbach.

On 2 December 1791, the reigning Prince and Margrave of Ansbach, Charles Alexander, who had also succeeded to Bayreuth, sold the sovereignty of his principalities to King Frederick William II of Prussia. The Margrave was middle-aged and childless, and Frederick William was his kinsman as the head of the House of Hohenzollern. The Margrave moved to England with his English second wife. Ansbach was formally annexed on 28 January 1792.

Princes and Margraves of Ansbach
 1398: Frederick VI, Burgrave of Nuremberg (from 1415 also Elector of Brandenburg)
 1440: Albert Achilles (from 1470 also Elector of Brandenburg)
 1486: Frederick I
 1515: George the Pious
 1543: George Frederick I
 1603: Joachim Ernst
 1625: Frederick III, Margrave of Brandenburg-Ansbach
 1634: Albert II
 1667: John Frederick
 1686: Christian Albrecht
 1692: George Frederick II the Younger
 1703: William Frederick (before 1686–1723)
 1723: Charles William Frederick (1712–1757)
 1757: Charles Alexander (to 1791)

See also
 Ansbach-Bayreuth in the American Revolution
 Wolf of Ansbach

External links
 The Ansbach-Bayreuth Army in America at Exulanten.com
 German States to 1918, A–E on WorldStatesmen.org
 
 
 Ansbach and Bayreuth on Tacitus Historical Atlas

 
1398 establishments in Europe
1390s establishments in the Holy Roman Empire
1792 disestablishments in the Holy Roman Empire
Britain's German allies during the American Revolution
Franconian Circle
Former states and territories of Bavaria
History of Ansbach
Lists of princes
Lists of nobility
Principalities of the Holy Roman Empire